Antonio Duvergé Duval (1807–April 11, 1855), a Dominican general of French origin and one of the most legendary military figures in the history of the Dominican Republic, served in the Dominican War of Independence. He was a hero and martyr who proclaimed the birth of the new Republic on February 28, 1844, in Bani and days later in Azua.

Origins 
Antonio Duvergé Duval was born in Mayagüez, Puerto Rico to French-Dominican Joseph Duverger and Maria Duval. His grandfather Alexander was born Nantes. A member of De la Rochejacquelein family, he left France during the Drownings at Nantes for being a royalist. Alexander fought for the French against Haitian General Toussaint Louverture. After the invasion of Santo Domingo by Jean-Jacques Dessalines, he was exiled to Puerto Rico with his son Joseph Duverger and his wife Maria Duval. In 1808, when Antonio Duvergé was one year old, the family returned to Santo Domingo, settling in San Cristobal and later in El Seibo. At that time the Dominican Republic was occupied by Haiti, Jean-Pierre Boyer unified the Spanish island under his rule. The family changed their surname from "du Vergier " to "Duvergé" in order to sound more Spanish and not to be confused with Haitians, who were the enemy at the time.

Private life 
In 1831 Duvergé married French-Dominican Rosa Montas, the daughter of the leader of the French residents in San Cristobal, with whom he had seven children. He devoted himself to the science of agriculture, livestock and woodwork, becoming well known in the region. He was well known for his friendship with the Puello brothers.

Military life 
Duvergé belonged to the separatist Dominican movement founded by Juan Pablo Duarte in 1838, known as La Trinitaria. Following the declaration of independence of the Dominican Republic on February 27 of 1844. Duvergé was a very important part in the military for the Independence, showing great courage and heroism in defense of the country. He is considered as national hero for his performance in the Battle of Azua on March 19 of 1844, the Battle of El Memiso, Battle of Estrelleta, Battle of Las Carreras and the Battle of Cachimán.

Duvergé is also known as the Father of the Dominican offensive strategy. Although he had not attended school he was a gifted leader and capable military organizer.

Military trial and death 
After the campaign of 1849, Duvergé's conflict between him and Pedro Santana increased. Duvergé was accused of conspiracy against the government of Santana, and was executed on April 11, 1855. His remains rest in the National Pantheon of the Dominican Republic in Santo Domingo. Antonio Duvergé Duval is still known as one of the most prominent leaders of the Dominican military and hero of Dominican national independence. General Duvergé is the namesake of the city of Duvergé in the Independencia Province, named in his honor. Likewise, a sector in the capital Santo Domingo was named after him.

Duvergé Family 
Today the Duvergé family is known as one of the cornerstones families of the Dominican Republic. Their participation in the War of Independence of the country is still celebrated. The family nobility hold the title in France of Count of De La Rochejacquelein. Antonio's cousins are the French general Henri de la Rochejaquelein and Dominican musician and diplomat in France Jose Antonio Rodriguez Duvergé.

Battles 
 Battle of Azua
 Battle of El Memiso
 Battle of Estrelleta
 Battle of El Número
 Battle of Las Carreras

References

1807 births
1855 deaths
Generals
Dominican Republic people of French descent
Dominican Republic people of Puerto Rican descent
Dominican Republic military personnel
Dominican Republic revolutionaries
19th-century rebels
19th-century Dominican Republic people 
Puerto Rican people of French descent
People of the Dominican War of Independence
French emigrants to the Dominican Republic
Executed French people
 Cent
People from Mayagüez, Puerto Rico